Tejanos (singular: Tejano/a; Spanish for "Texan", originally borrowed from the Caddo tayshas) are the residents of the state of Texas who are culturally descended from the Mexican population of Tejas and Coahuila that lived in the region prior to it becoming what is now known as the state of Texas before it became a U.S. state in 1845. The term is also sometimes applied to all Texans of Mexican descent.

The original word Tejano, with a "J" not an "X', comes from the indigenous Caddo people's language, from the word tayshas, in which the word means "friend" or "ally", a title given to the indigenous population that moved northward by early Aztec and Spanish rulers and combined forces, including, but not limited to, the Lipan N'de Apache People, Coahuiltecas, and Huasteca indigenous people from Zacatecas.

The Aztec and Spanish combined forces (the early Casta foundations of the Mexican government) drove original Tejanos northward for nearly 500 years. 
Fleeing for their lives many ended up under the protection of Caddo and Comanche Tribes.

 They later may have consisted variously of Peninsular Spanish, Criollo Spanish, White Mexican (after the independence of Mexico), mestizo, or Indigenous origin. The more commonly understood meaning, however, is simply any Texan of Indigenous/Mexican descent.

Alongside Californios and Neomexicanos, Tejanos are part of the larger Hispano community of the United States, who have lived in the American Southwest since the 16th century.

Historically, the Spanish term Tejano has been used to identify various groups of people. During the Spanish colonial era, the term was primarily applied to Spanish settlers of the region now known as the state of Texas, which was first part of New Spain and after 1821 was part of Mexico. After settlers entered from the United States and gained the independence of the Republic of Texas, the term was applied to mostly Spanish-speaking Texans, Hispanicized Germans, and other Spanish-speaking residents.

In practice, many members of traditionally Tejano communities often have varying degrees of fluency in Spanish, with some having virtually no Spanish proficiency, though they are still considered culturally part of the community.

Since the early 20th century, Tejano has been more broadly used to identify Texan Mexican Americans. It is also a term used to identify people currently living in the state, as opposed to newcomers, in the areas settled.

Etymology 
The word Tejano, with a "J" not and "X", comes from the Spanish interpretation of the original Caddo indigenous word Tayshas, which means friend or ally

History

Spanish government

As early as 1519, Alonso Álvarez de Pineda claimed the area which is now Texas for Spain. The Spanish monarchy paid little attention to the province until 1685. In that year, the Crown learned of a French colony in the region and worried that it might threaten Spanish colonial mines and shipping routes. King Carlos II sent ten expeditions to find the French colony, but they were unsuccessful. Between 1690 and 1693 expeditions were made to the Texas region, and they acquired better knowledge of it for the provincial government and settlers who came later.

Tejano settlements developed in three distinct regions: the northern Nacogdoches region, the Bexar–Goliad region along the San Antonio River, and the frontier between the Nueces River and the Rio Grande, an area used largely for ranching. These populations shared certain characteristics, yet they were independent of one another. The main unifying factor was their shared responsibility for defending the northern frontier of New Spain. Some of the first settlers were Isleños from the Canary Islands. Their families were among the first to reside at the Presidio San Antonio de Bexar in 1731, which is modern-day San Antonio, Texas.

Ranching was a major activity in the Bexar-Goliad area, which consisted of a belt of ranches that extended along the San Antonio River between Bexar (San Antonio area) and Goliad. The Nacogdoches settlement was located farther north and east. Tejanos from Nacogdoches traded with the French and Anglo residents of Louisiana, and they were culturally influenced by them. The third settlement was located north of the Rio Grande, toward the Nueces River. The ranchers were citizens of Spanish origin from Tamaulipas and (what is now) northern Mexico, and they identified with Spanish Criollo culture.

On September 16, 1810, Miguel Hidalgo y Costilla, a Catholic priest, launched the Mexican War of Independence with the issuing of his Grito de Dolores, or “Cry of Delores.” He marched across Mexico and gathered an army of nearly 90,000 poor farmers and civilians. These troops ran up into an army of 6,000 well-trained and armed Spanish troops; most of Hidalgo's troops fled or were killed at the Battle of Calderón Bridge Bernardo Gutiérrez de Lara, a believer in independence from Spain, organized a revolution army together with José Menchaca from the Villa de San Fernando de Bejar. After the defeat and execution of Father Miguel Hidalgo y Costilla, Gutiérrez de Lara traveled to Washington, D.C. to request help from the United States. He requested an audience with President James Madison, but was refused. He did meet with Secretary of State James Monroe, who was busy planning the invasion of Canada in the War against Great Britain. On December 10, 1810, Gutiérrez de Lara addressed the United States House of Representatives. There was no official help by the United States government to the revolution. However, Gutiérrez de Lara did return with financial help, weapons and almost 700 "ex-United States Army veterans". The challenges Monroe faced revolved around the Napoleonic War and American neutrality.

Gutiérrez de Lara's army would defeat the Spanish army and the first independent Republic of Texas, "the Green Republic" was born with the Declaration of Independence. Spain had reinforced their armies in the colonies and a well-equipped army led by General Juaquin de Arredondo known as the "El Carnicero," invaded the Green Republic of Tejas. During the time of the Republic the Spaniard José Álvarez de Toledo y Dubois, had been undermining Gutiérrez de Lara's government. Toledo was successful and de Lara was ousted. Toledo then led the Republican Army of the North (the Green Army) into a trap against the Spanish army and no prisoners were taken by the Spanish at the Battle of Medina. The Spanish army would march into San Antonio. The Spanish army rounded everyone they could find from Nacogdoches to El Espiritu de Santo (Goliad) and brought them to San Antonio. The Spanish murdered four males a day for 270 days, eradicating the Tejano population and leaving the women when the Spanish army left in 1814. Toledo returned to Spain, a Spanish hero.

In January 1840, the northern Mexican states of Nuevo León, Coahuila, and Tamaulipas seceded from Mexico to establish the Rio Grande Republic, with its capital in what is now Laredo, Texas, but became part of Mexico again in November 1840.

Mexican government

By 1821 at the end of the Mexican War of Independence, about 4,000 Tejano lived in Mexican Texas, alongside a lesser number of foreign settlers. In addition, several thousand New Mexicans lived in the areas of Paso del Norte (now El Paso, Texas) and Nuevo Santander, incorporating Laredo and the Rio Grande Valley.

During the 1820s, many settlers from the United States and other nations moved to Mexican Texas, settling mostly in the eastern area. The passage of a national colonization law encouraged immigration, granting the immigrants citizenship if they declared loyalty to Mexico. By 1830, the 30,000 recent settlers in Texas (who were primarily English speakers from the United States) outnumbered the Hispanos Tejano six to one.

The Texians and Tejano alike rebelled against attempts by the government to centralize authority in Mexico City and other measures implemented by Santa Anna. Tensions between the central Mexican government and the settlers eventually resulted in the Texas Revolution.

20th century
In 1915, insurgents in south Texas wrote a manifesto that was circulated in the town of San Diego and all across South Texas. The manifesto "Plan de San Diego" called on Mexicans, American Indians, Blacks, Germans, and Japanese to liberate south Texas and kill their racist white American oppressors. Numerous cross-border raids, murders, and sabotage took place. Some Tejanos strongly repudiated the Plan. According to Benjamin H. Johnson, middle class Mexicans born in the US desire to affirm their United States loyalty resulted in their founding the League of United Latin American Citizens (LULAC). It was headed by professionals, business leaders, and progressives, and it became the central Tejano organization promoting civic pride and civil rights.

Other sources attribute the founding of the organization in 1929 largely to Tejano veterans of World War I, who wanted to improve civil rights for Mexican-American citizens of the United States. They were socially discriminated against in Texas. Only American citizens were admitted as members to LULAC, and there was an emphasis on people becoming educated and assimilated in order to advance.

In 1963, Tejanos in Crystal City organized politically and won elections; their candidates dominated the city government and the school board. Their activism signaled the emergence of modern Tejano politics.  In 1969–70, a different Tejano coalition, the La Raza Unida Party, came to office in Crystal City. The new leader was José Ángel Gutiérrez, a radical nationalist who worked to form a Chicano nationalist movement across the Southwest, 1969–79. He promoted cultural terminology (Chicano, Aztlan) designed to unite the militants; but his movement split into competing factions in the late 1970s.

Demographics
Most Tejanos are concentrated in southern Texas, in historic areas of Spanish colonial settlement and closer to the border that developed. The city of San Antonio is the historic center of Tejano culture. During the Spanish colonial period of Texas, most colonial settlers of northern New Spain – including Texas, northern Mexico, and the American Southwest – were descendants of Spaniards.

Although the number of Tejanos whose families have lived in Texas since before 1836 is unknown, it was estimated that 5,000 Tejano descendants of San Antonio's Canarian founders lived in the city in 2008. The community of Canarian descent still maintains the culture of their ancestors.

Tejanos may identify as being of Mexican, Chicano, Mexican American, Spanish, Hispano, American and/or Indigenous ancestry. In urban areas, as well as some rural communities, Tejanos tend to be well integrated into both the Hispanic and mainstream American cultures. Especially among younger generations, a number identify more with the mainstream and may understand little or no Spanish.

Most of the people whose ancestors colonized Texas and the northern Mexican states during the Spanish colonial period identified with the Spaniards, Criollos, or Mestizos who were born in the colony.  Many of the latter find their history and identity in the history of Spain, Mesoamerica and the history of the United States. Spain's colonial provinces (Spanish Texas and Spanish Louisiana) participated on the side of the rebels in the American Revolutionary War.

Ethnic and national origins
In the 2007 American Community Survey (ACS) data,
 Tejanos are defined as those Texans descended from colonists of the Spanish colonial period (before 1821), or descended from Indigenous Spanish Mexicans, and indigenous Mexicans.

Tejanos are descended from the colonists of Spaniard, Mestizo, or indigenous origin, or Hispanicized European heritage, including Frenchmen such as Juan Seguin, Italians such as Jose Cassiano, or Corsican like Antonio Navarro. Spanish post-colonial settlers stayed in Texas as refugees fleeing Spanish Civil War. Their descendants were added to the Tejano population. Also represented are ethnic Germans, who were concentrated in the Edwards Plateau following mid-19th century immigration. The region's Poles, Czechs, Slovaks, Danes, Dutch, Swedes, Irish (see also Irish Mexican), Scots, Welsh, and Anglo Americans who arrived in the 19th century – were also considered Tejanos, as they were Hispanicized. The former two ethnicities (with Germans) would contribute greatly to Tex-Mex music. Some Arabs are also considered Tejanos, as Arab Mexicans settled Texas during the Mexican Revolution.

Culture

Music

Genuine Tejano music is descended from a mixture of German and Czechoslovakian polka and oom papa sounds and Mexican Spanish strings, and is similar to the French folk music of Louisiana, known as "Cajun music", blended with the sounds of rock and roll, R&B, pop, and country, and with Mexican influences such as conjunto music. Narciso Martinez is the father of Conjunto Music, followed by the legendary Santiago Jimenez (Father of Flaco Jimenez).
Sunny and the Sunglows lead the rock and roll era in the 1950's along with Little Joe, and Rudy Guerra, who were originators of the Rock and roll portion of genre. Today Tejano music is a wide array of multi cultural genres including Rockteno and Tejano Rap. The American cowboy culture and music was born from the meeting of the European-American Texians, Indigenous people, colonists mostly from the American South, and the original Tejano pioneers and their vaquero, or "cowboy" culture.

Food

The cuisine that would come to be known as "Tex-Mex" originated with the Tejanos. It developed from Spanish and North American indigenous commodities with influences from Mexican cuisine.

Tex-Mex cuisine is characterized by its widespread use of melted cheese, meat (particularly beef), peppers, beans, and spices, in addition to corn or flour tortillas. Chili con carne, burritos, carne asada, chalupa, chili con queso, enchiladas, and fajitas are all Tex-Mex specialties. A common feature of Tex-Mex is the combination plate, with several of the above on one large platter. Serving tortilla chips and a hot sauce or salsa as an appetizer is also a Tex-Mex development. Cabrito, barbacoa, carne seca, and other products of cattle culture have been common in the ranching cultures of South Texas and northern Mexico. In the 20th century, Tex-Mex took on Americanized elements such as yellow cheese, as goods from the rest of the United States became cheap and readily available. Tex-Mex has imported flavors from other spicy cuisines, such as the use of cumin. Cumin is often referred to by its Spanish name, comino.

A common Tex-Mex breakfast dish served is a "breakfast taco." This usually consists of a flour tortilla or corn tortilla served using a single fold. This is in contrast to the burrito-style method of completely encasing the ingredients. Some of the typical ingredients used are a combination of: eggs, potatoes, cheese, peppers, bacon, sausage, and barbacoa. Breakfast tacos are traditionally served with an optional red or green salsa.

Politics 
Historically, the majority of the Tejano population in South Texas had voted for Democratic Party since the first half of the 20th century. The 2020 United States presidential election was considered a turning point in their political support, as part of a "red tide" for South Texas, where Republican candidate Donald Trump performed better in areas associated with Tejano population than during former elections. Zapata was the only county that turned majority Republican from Democratic in South Texas, while Starr County saw the strongest pro-Trump swing of any county in the U.S., a 55% increase compared to the 2016 election.

Tejanos are noted to be more supportive of the Republican Party than other Latino populations in Texas. Politically, Tejanos have been compared to Cuban Americans in Miami and Venezuelan Americans, who also disproportionately vote for Republican candidates among Latino voters. The New York Times attributed the relative success of Donald Trump among the Tejano community to concerns about regional economy, which is based on gas and oil. The Wall Street Journal described concerns about possible unemployment caused by COVID-19 lockdowns as another source of Republican Tejano support. Reporter Jack Herrera argues that Tejanos are culturally conservative and identify with Republican positions on gun rights, Christianity, and abortion. Tejanos are also more likely to be Protestant Evangelical Christian than Roman Catholics.

Notable people

Tejanos of colonial origin or descent 
Settlers and descendants:

 Gaspar Flores de Abrego
 Ignacio Lorenzo de Armas
 Simón de Arocha
 Rosa María Hinojosa de Ballí
 Santos Benavides
 José Tomás Canales
 José María Jesús Carbajal
 Henri Castro
 Josef Centeno
 Mariana W. de Coronel
 Juan Curbelo (Tejano settler)
 Juan José Elguézabal
 Blas María de la Garza Falcón
 Manuel N. Flores
 Salvador Flores
 Carlos de la Garza 
 José Antonio de la Garza
 Rafael Gonzales
 Damacio Jiménez  
 Juan Leal
 Eva Longoria
 Selena
 A. H. Cadena y López
 Antonio Rodríguez Medero
 Antonio Menchaca 
 Jose Menchaca
 Juan Moya
 Ramón Músquiz
 Jose Antonio Navarro
 Antonio de Olivares
 Salvador Rodríguez (regidor)
 Francisco Antonio Ruiz
 José Francisco Ruiz
 Salvador Rodríguez
 Don Tomás Sánchez
 Juan Seguín
 Erasmo Seguín
 Vicente Álvarez Travieso
 José de Urrutia
 Jaci Velasquez
 Juan Martin de Veramendi
 Tomás Felipe de Winthuisen
 Antonio Gil Ybarbo 
 Ignacio Zaragoza
 Lorenzo de Zavala
 Adina Emilia De Zavala
 Charles Floyd Wright

See also

 Texians
 Hispanics
 History of the Mexican-Americans in Texas
 Hispanic and Latino Americans in Texas

References

Further reading
 Alonzo, Armando C. Tejano Legacy: Rancheros and Settlers in South Texas, 1734-1900 (1998)
 Hubert Howe Bancroft. The Works of Hubert Howe Bancroft,
 v 15: History of the North Mexican States and Texas, Volume 1: 1531 - 1800
 v 16 History of the North Mexican States and Texas, Volume 2: 1801 - 1889
 Buitron Jr., Richard A. The Quest for Tejano Identity in San Antonio, Texas, 1913-2000 (2004)  excerpt and text search
 Chávez, John R. The Lost Land: The Chicano Image of the Southwest (Albuquerque, 1984)
 De León, Arnoldo. They Called Them Greasers: Anglo Attitudes toward Mexicans in Texas, 1821–1900 (Austin, 1983)
 De León, Arnoldo. Mexican Americans in Texas: A Brief History, 2nd ed. (1999)
 García, Richard A. Rise of the Mexican American Middle Class: San Antonio, 1929-1941 1991
 Montejano, David. Anglos and Mexicans in the Making of Texas, 1836-1986 (1987)

 Navarro, Armando. Mexican American Youth Organization: Avant-Garde of the Movement in Texas (University of Texas Press, 1995)
 Ramos, Ratil A. Beyond the Alamo: Forging Mexican Ethnicity in San Antonio, 1821-1861 (University of North Carolina Press, 2008)
 San Miguel, Guadalupe. Tejano Proud: Tex-Mex Music in the Twentieth Century (2002)
 Taylor, Paul S. Mexican Labor in the United States. 2 vols. 1930–1932, on Texas
 Stewart, Kenneth L., and Arnoldo De León. Not Room Enough: Mexicans, Anglos, and Socioeconomic Change in Texas, 1850-1900 (1993)
 de la Teja, Jesús F. San Antonio de Béxar: A Community on New Spain's Northern Frontier (1995).
 Tijerina, Andrés. Tejanos and Texas under the Mexican Flag, 1821-1836 (1994),
 Tijerina, Andrés. Tejano Empire: Life on the South Texas Ranchos (1998).
 Timmons, W. H. El Paso: A Borderlands History (1990).
 Weber, David J. The Mexican Frontier, 1821-1846: The American Southwest under Mexico (1982)

Politics
 Guglielmo, Thomas A. "Fighting for Caucasian Rights: Mexicans, Mexican Americans, and the Transnational Struggle for Civil Rights in World War II Texas," Journal of American History, 92 (March 2006) in History Cooperative
 MacDonald, L. Lloyd Tejanos in the 1835 Texas Revolution (2009) excerpt and text search
 Márquez, Benjamin. LULAC: The Evolution of a Mexican American Political Organization (1993)
 Marquez, Benjamin; Espino, Rodolfo. "Mexican American support for third parties: the case of La Raza Unida," Ethnic & Racial Studies (Feb 2010) 33#2 pp 290–312. (online)
 Navarro, Armando. La Raza Unida Party: A Chicano Challenge to the U.S. Two Party Dictatorship (Temple University Press, 2000)
 Quintanilla, Linda J., “Chicana Activists of Austin and Houston, Texas: A Historical Analysis” (PhD University of Houston, 2005). Order No. DA3195964.
 de la Teja, Jesus F. ed. Tejano Leadership in Mexican and Revolutionary Texas (Texas A&M University Press, 2010) 274pp excerpt and text search

Religion
 Martinez, Juan Francisco. Sea La Luz: The Making of Mexican Protestantism in the American Southwest, 1829-1900 (2006)
 Matovina, Timothy. Guadalupe and Her Faithful: Latino Catholics in San Antonio, from Colonial Origins to the Present (2005). 232 pp.
 Matovina, Timothy M. Tejano Religion and Ethnicity, San Antonio, 1821-1860 (1995)
 Trevino, Roberto R. The Church in the Barrio: Mexican American Ethno-Catholicism in Houston. (2006). 308pp.

Women
 Blackwelder, Julia Kirk. Women of the Depression: Caste and Culture in San Antonio 1984. excerpt and text search
 Deutsch, Sarah No Separate Refuge: Culture, Class, and Gender on the Anglo-Hispanic Frontier in the American Southwest, 1880-1940 1987
 Dysart, Jane. "Mexican Women in San Antonio, 1830-1860: The Assimilation Process" Western Historical Quarterly 7 (October 1976): 365–375. in JSTOR
 Fregoso; Rosa Linda. Mexicana Encounters: The Making of Social Identities on the Borderlands (2003)

Historiography
 Garcia, Richard A. "Changing Chicano Historiography," Reviews in American History 34.4 (2006) 521–528 in Project MUSE

Texas society
 Tejano
 
 
American regional nicknames
Hispanic and Latino American culture in San Antonio
 
Spanish-American culture in Texas
 
 
White Americans